Bill Sherman is an American composer, producer, arranger, and orchestrator. He is known for his work on In the Heights, Hamilton, and Sesame Street.

Sherman was born in New York to Susan B. Sherman and Dr. Fredrick T. Sherman. Sherman graduated from Wesleyan University in Middletown, Connecticut in 2002. In 2003, he joined his roommate Lin-Manuel Miranda to form the freestyle rap group Freestyle Love Supreme, while also working with Miranda to orchestrate and arrange the music for In the Heights. His work on In the Heights won him the 2008 Tony Award for Best Orchestrations and the 2008 Grammy Award for Best Musical Show Album. He collaborated again with Miranda to produce the Hamilton album, for which he won the 2015 Grammy Award for Best Musical Theater Album.

Sherman is the musical director for several Sesame Workshop shows, including Sesame Street, for which he has written over 3000 songs. He has won three Daytime Entertainment Creative Arts Emmy Awards for "Outstanding Original Song – Children’s and Animation" for his work on Sesame street: "What I Am" in 2011, "The Power of Yet" in 2015, and "A Song About Songs" in 2018.

References

External links 
 

American record producers
Wesleyan University alumni
American music arrangers
20th-century American composers
Sesame Street music
Year of birth missing (living people)
Living people
Grammy Award winners
Daytime Emmy Award winners
Tony Award winners